Anshei Israel Synagogue is a historic synagogue located in Lisbon, Connecticut, United States. The Orthodox congregation was founded with 15 families and constructed the synagogue in 1936. It was built by George Allen & Sons. The interior is a single room that is lined with five benches before the sacred ark. The congregation's membership dwindled throughout the 1940s and 1950s, limiting the services to holidays before finally closing in the early 1980s. Rules in the congregation were not as strictly enforced as in the Old World, as there was no curtain to separate the sexes and distant members were allowed to drive part of the way to its services. The Town of Lisbon took ownership of the property in the 1980s. The synagogue is currently maintained by the Lisbon Historical Society. The synagogue was added to the National Register of Historic Places in 1995.

Construction
In the early 1800s of Connecticut, people of the Jewish faith were few, with just twelve persons in the whole of Connecticut. In 1843, Jewish public worship was first permitted after a petition to the Connecticut General Assembly. Early Jewish services were held in private homes or in rented halls and later in the first synagogues, which were usually adapted from churches. Rural synagogues like the Anshei Israel Synagogue were modest structures and "reflect the need of Jewish farming and summer congregations for buildings suitable for worship that were within their limited financial and geographic boundaries."

The land upon which the synagogue was built was donated by Harry Rothenberg around 1936. The congregation, pooled their money to construct the synagogue. Flanking the tower on each side is a pair of 2-over-2 windows. Paint remnants show that the sash was previously painted a bright blue.

After passing through the tower, the single room has a raised bimah and ark at the front. The original bema and ark remain.  The interior of the ark is concealed by a gold parochet; and a menorah rests on the podium. Chairs and five wooden, backless benches were provided for seating, which was described as "an unusual arrangement in historic Connecticut synagogues". Though the building had electricity, it had no heat or plumbing; though a wood stove was used to provide heat and an outhouse was previously behind the synagogue.

Use 
The founding congregation of 15 families came from Poland and Russia and lived in the surrounding towns of Plainfield, Lisbon, Griswold, and Jewett City. Rothenberg became the first cantor of the Anshei Israel Synagogue and the service would continue to serve the Orthodox congregation for decades. The congregation's membership dwindled throughout the 1940s and 1950s, which limited services to holidays. The synagogue finally closed when it could no longer steadily gather a minyin, ten men, in 1987. The town of Lisbon acquired the synagogue in the 1980s from the synagogue's last six members. In 2004, the synagogue was open during "Walking Weekend" events.

Caroline Read-Burns, president of the Lisbon Historical Society and Jerome Zuckerbraun, a member of the synagogue, discussed the Orthodox congregation's rules and noted that some rules were not as strictly enforced as in the Old World. As an Orthodox congregation, members were to walk to the synagogue, but some distant members would drive and "walk the last mile or so." The synagogue did not use curtains to separate men and women, as was the norm for Orthodox services in Poland and Russia. The women's seating was at a table on the right side of the sanctuary, near the door. The structure is well-preserved, but not currently in use.

Importance 
The Anshei Israel Synagogue was added to the National Register of Historic Places in 1995. It is recognized as an architecturally significant example of "a small country Jewish house of worship". Its architecture is the "epitome of simplicity" and it remains an important pre-1945 Jewish house of worship that is in a rural setting and possessing integrity in its design. The Day reflected Read-Burn's comments that the synagogue may "only one of its kind in the country". In 2001, the building was featuring on Connecticut Journal, a program of Connecticut Public Television.

In 2005, the building was in need of some repairs due to neglect and damage from squirrels. The Lisbon Historical Society received a $5,000 grant from the Quinebaug Shetucket National Heritage Corridor to make repairs on the synagogue. Repairs would be done to repair the structure and the electrical wiring would be replaced for free by the students at the Norwich Regional Vocational Technical School.

See also

National Register of Historic Places listings in New London County, Connecticut

References

Synagogues in Connecticut
Lisbon, Connecticut
Buildings and structures in New London County, Connecticut
National Register of Historic Places in New London County, Connecticut
Synagogues on the National Register of Historic Places in Connecticut
Synagogues completed in 1936
1936 establishments in Connecticut